The Laser Tank is a fictional vehicle in the Space 1999 television series.

Laser Tank may also refer to:
 1K17 Szhatie, Soviet laser tank
 LaserTank, a 1995 computer puzzle game
 Laser Tank (board game), a 1980 board game published by Judges Guild